John Stockton (born 1962) is an American retired basketball player.

John Stockton may also refer to:

John Stockton (Michigan soldier) (1798–1878), American soldier, pioneer, and territorial legislator
John P. Stockton (1826–1900), American politician from New Jersey
Hust Stockton, full name John Houston "Hust" Stockton (1901–1967), American football player in the National Football League, grandfather of the basketball player

See also
Stockton (surname)